"Look Alive" is a song by American hip hop duo Rae Sremmurd. It was released on April 14, 2016 by EarDrummers and Interscope Records, as the second single from their second studio album SremmLife 2. The song was produced by Mike Will Made It.

Music video
The song's accompanying music video premiered on June 13, 2016 on Rae Sremmurd's YouTube account on Vevo.

Remix
The official remix features additional verses by Migos.

Charts

Weekly charts

Year-end charts

Certifications

Release history

Personnel
Credits adapted from SremmLife 2 booklet.

Song credits

Writing – Aaquil Brown, Khalif Brown, Rashod Odom, Jiovanni Romano, Michael Williams II
Production – Louie Ji, Mike Will Made It & Shod Beatz
Recording – Randy Lanphear & Swae Lee at Tree Sound Studios in Atlanta, Georgia
Audio mixing – Jaycen Joshua & Stephen Hybicki at Larrabee Sound Studios in North Hollywood, California
Assistant mix engineering – Maddox Chhim & Dave Nakaji
Mastering – Dave Kutch, The Mastering Palace, New York City

References

External links

Lyrics of this song at Genius

2016 songs
2016 singles
Rae Sremmurd songs
Interscope Records singles
Songs written by Swae Lee
Song recordings produced by Mike Will Made It
Songs written by Mike Will Made It
Songs written by Slim Jxmmi